Nomaglio is a comune (municipality) in the Metropolitan City of Turin in the Italian region Piedmont, located about  north of Turin.

Nomaglio is an agricultural centre in the Canavese traditional region, on the slopes of the Serra d'Ivrea. Historically, this commune was the seat of the medieval lords of Settimo Vittone.

References

Cities and towns in Piedmont